In Germany's federal electoral system, a single party or parliamentary group rarely wins an absolute majority of seats in the Bundestag, and thus coalition governments, rather than majority governments, are the usually expected outcome of a German election. As German political parties are often associated with particular colors, coalitions are frequently given nicknames based on the colors included. Prominent political parties in Germany are the CDU/CSU (black), the SPD (red), the Greens (green), the Left (red, presented as magenta), the AfD (blue), and the FDP (yellow).

History 
Germany has traditionally had proportional representation electoral systems, both at the federal level and in the states. Because a multi-party system has emerged with two major parties (CDU/CSU and SPD) and a number of smaller parties hat are nevertheless frequently represented in parliaments (Alliance 90/The Greens, FDP, The Left, AfD), single-party governments with absolute majorities are quite rare. 

At the federal level, a single-party government has occurred only once so far: Between 1957 and 1961, the CDU/CSU held an absolute majority in the Bundestag and was able to govern alone (cabinet Adenauer III); even then, the minor German Party was included in the government for the first three years of its existence, and the government was not a fully single-faction cabinet until those ministers joined the CDU in July 1960. In the states, too, single-party governments have been quite rare, with the exception of the Free State of Bavaria, where the CSU has many times been able to achieve absolute majorities in state elections. Currently, only one of 16 German states, Saarland, has a single-party government, consisting solely of the SPD.

There are two two-party coalitions usually preferred for reasons of ideological proximity; the more center-right black/yellow coalition (CDU/CSU and FDP) and the more center-left red/green coalition (SPD and Alliance 90/The Greens). A third type of two-party-coalition, which occurs especially after inconclusive election results, is the "Grand coalition" of the two larger parties CDU/CSU and SPD, but these are relatively rare, due to the ideological difference between the two. Parties frequently make statements ahead of elections about which coalitions they categorically reject.

In Germany, coalitions rarely consist of more than two parties (CDU and CSU, two allies which on federal level always form the CDU/CSU caucus, counted as a single party). However, in the 2010s coalitions at the state level increasingly included three parties, often FDP, Greens and one of the major parties or "red-red-green" coalitions of SPD, Left and Greens. The Greens have joined governments on the state level in eleven coalitions in seven various combinations.

In December 2021, following the September German general elections, a traffic light coalition (SPD, FDP, and Greens) led by Olaf Scholz took power in Germany, the first time a three-party coalition had formed the federal government.

Übergroß coalitions (über + groß meaning extra large) are coalitions that include more parties than mathematically necessary for a majority. However, generally the parties are reluctant to join coalitions where they are not mathematically needed towards a majority. These kind of coalitions are usually formed in times of crisis, or alternatively when:

 a larger than simple majority is needed (such as for constitutional amendments). For this reason, they were common during the early days of the Federal Republic, at federal level they were formed twice (Adenauer II, where CDU/CSU came just one seat short of majority and could have formed a coalition with just one party, but chose to form a coalition with three (FDP, DP and GB/BHE; and the aforementioned Adenauer III). At state level, the last time such a coalition was formed was in Hamburg following 1970 elections, where SPD alone held a 10-seat majority, but still chose to go into coalition with FDP.
 Alternatively, in the case of relatively undisciplined parliamentary groups, where too narrow a majority carries a strong risk of failure, such as in Saxony-Anhalt following the 2021 state election. A Grand coalition would have held a one-seat majority, but Minister President Reiner Haseloff (CDU) also chose to include FDP and form a Germany coalition. At the minister president election, he unexpectedly failed to get elected on the first ballot, falling just one vote short, which was attributed to right-wing dissent within his party. On the second ballot, he was elected.

Possible combinations 
Possible coalitions include:
 Grand coalition (CDU/CSU and SPD) ⚫🔴
 Jamaica coalition (CDU/CSU, FDP, and Greens) ⚫🟡🟢
 Traffic light coalition (SPD, FDP, and Greens) 🔴🟡🟢
 Germany coalition (de) (CDU/CSU, SPD, and FDP) ⚫🔴🟡
 Kenya coalition (or Afghanistan coalition) (CDU/CSU, SPD, and Greens) ⚫🔴🟢
 Red-green coalition (SPD and Greens) 🔴🟢
 Red–red coalition (SPD and Left) 🔴🔴
 Red–red–green coalition (SPD, Left, and Greens) 🔴🔴🟢
 Social-liberal coalition (SPD and FDP) 🔴🟡
 Black-yellow coalition (or liberal-conservative, Christian-liberal, center-right or bürgerliche coalition) (CDU/CSU and FDP) ⚫🟡
 Black-green coalition (de) (aka Kiwi coalition) (CDU/CSU and Greens) ⚫🟢
 Zimbabwe coalition (CDU/CSU, SPD, FDP and Greens) ⚫🔴🟡🟢

Due to the cordon sanitaire all other parties have towards the AfD, hypothetical coalitions involving the AfD are rarely discussed. A coalition of CDU/CSU, AfD and FDP would have a majority in the 20th Bundestag elected in 2021, but was not seriously discussed publicly by either media or politicians. Such a coalition does not have a common nickname, but the term "Bahamas coalition", in reference to the colors of the flag of the Bahamas (including the AfD's light blue), was coined in 2013. Other coalitions involving the AfD are considered even more unlikely due to lack of parliamentary majority, ideological differences and the cordon sanitaire.

The state of Schleswig-Holstein is home to a Danish minority, who have their own ethnic party called the South Schleswig Voters' Association (SSW). In state politics, a coalition between the SPD, Greens, and SSW, is called the Danish traffic light (de), or Gambia coalition because these parties' colors (including the SSW's dark blue) match the flag of the Gambia. Such a coalition was in power between 2012 and 2017, led by minister president Torsten Albig, and with SSW leader Anke Spoorendonk serving as justice minister.

References 

 
Politics of Germany